Giacomo Filippo Foresti da Bergamo (1434–1520) was an Augustinian monk, known as the author of several significant early printed works. He was a chronicler and Biblical scholar.

His Supplementum chronicarum (first printed at Venice, 1483) was a supplement to the usual universal chronicle; it ran to numerous subsequent editions. Though it mixes mythological figures, treated euhemeristically as historical ones, on an equal footing with Christian cultural heroes, with additional chapters on the Sibyls and the Trojan War, amongst other things, it was thought to contain Giovanni da Carignano's lost work on papal contacts at Avignon in 1306 with Ethiopian visitors. Recent research has both drawn attention to the Legenda Aurea and the letter of Prester John as possible sources for Foresti's narration of the episode, casting doubt on the veracity of an Ethiopian embassy to Europe at this date, as well as a section in the Cronica Universalis of Galvano Fiamma, indicating conversely that this section of Foresti's account is entirely and directly based, to exclusion of other sources, on the cartographic treatise of Giovanni da Carignano.

His De claris mulieribus updated the work of Boccaccio of the same title. It was dedicated to Beatrice of Aragon. This book, as well as the Supplementum, influenced many subsequent publications.

He also wrote a well-known confessional.

Works 

 Supplementum chronicarum, Bernardino Benali, Venice 1483
 De plurimis claris selectisque mulieribus, Lorenzo de Rubeis, Ferrara 1497

Notes 

1434 births
1520 deaths
Augustinian friars
Italian chroniclers
15th-century Italian historians
Italian male writers